HMS Lively was a member of the Gibraltar Group of 24-gun sixth rates. After commissioning she spent her career in Home waters on trade protection duties. She was broken in 1738.

Lively was the eighth named vessel since it was used for a 45-gun ship launched at Deptford in 1545, rebuilt 1558 and wrecked in 1563 off the Rye.

Construction
She was ordered on 22 April 1712 from Plymouth Dockyard to be built under the guidance of John Phillips, Master Shipwright of Plymouth. She was launched on 28 May 1713. She was completed for sea on 19 March 1715. Due to her completion in 1715 she would not carry the 4-pounder guns as they were removed from these ships in 1714.

Commissioned Service
She was commissioned in 1715 under the command of Captain St John Charlton, RN for service on the west coast of Scotland and Irish Waters. In 1720 she was under the command of Captain William Rowley, RN on the same service. She underwent a small repair at Plymouth costing £1,605.11.4d completed in August 1723. She returned to her previous service. In 1729 she underwent another small repair at Plymouth costing £559.19.8d in May 1729. In January 1729 she was under the command of Captain John Onley, RN for the Bristol Channel moving to Irish Waters in 1732. With the court-martial of Captain Onley on 3 December 1738, she came under the command of Captain Edward Legge, RN for service in the Bristol Channel. She was paid off on 21 November 1738.

Disposition
HMS Lively was broken at Portsmouth by Admiralty Order (AO) 30 November 1738, completing in December 1738.

Notes

Citations

References
 Winfield 2009, British Warships in the Age of Sail (1603 – 1714), by Rif Winfield, published by Seaforth Publishing, England © 2009, EPUB , Chapter 6, The Sixth Rates, Vessels acquired from 2 May 1660, Gibraltar Group, Lively
 Winfield 2007, British Warships in the Age of Sail (1714 – 1792), by Rif Winfield, published by Seaforth Publishing, England © 2007, EPUB , Chapter 6, Sixth Rates, Sixth Rates of 20 or 24 guns, Vessels in Service at 1 August 1714, Gibraltar Group, Lively
 Colledge, Ships of the Royal Navy, by J.J. Colledge, revised and updated by Lt Cdr Ben Warlow and Steve Bush, published by Seaforth Publishing, Barnsley, Great Britain, © 2020, EPUB , (EPUB), Section L (Lively)

 

1710s ships
Corvettes of the Royal Navy
Ships built in Portsmouth
Naval ships of the United Kingdom